Another Girl Another Planet is a 1992 film written and directed by Michael Almereyda. The film is notable for being shot on a Fisher-Price PXL 2000 children's camera.

Premise
A romantic drama about Bill, who struggles to find a lasting relationship and meaningful connection through a succession of women, who have all been touched in some form by the death of someone in their lives.

Cast
Barry Del Sherman as Bill (credited as Barry Sherman)
Isabel Gillies as Finley
Bob Gosse as Man in Bar
Elina Löwensohn as Mia
Paula Malcomson as Bartender
Lisa Perisot as Prudence
Nic Ratner as Nic
Tom Roma as Man in Bar
Maggie Rush as Trish
Mary B. Ward as Ramona

Critical reception
Vincent Canby of The New York Times wrote "Michael Almereyda's 56-minute 'Another Girl, Another Planet' is something else entirely. It's as American as the East Village walk-up in which it was made, and as comically angst-ridden and gray as its images. 'Another Girl, Another Planet' was initially shot on a Fisher-Price Pixel toy video camera, then transferred to 16-millimeter film."

The National Society of Film Critics gave the film a special citation in its 1992 awards for "expanding the possibilities of experimental filmmaking, including the use of a Pixelvision toy camcorder."

References

External links

Interview with Michael Almereyda about the film
Review by Adrian Martin

1992 films
1992 independent films
Films directed by Michael Almereyda
American independent films
1990s English-language films
1990s American films